Donald Gardner may refer to:

 Donald R. Gardner, U.S. Marine Corps officer and former president of the Marine Corps University
 Donald Yetter Gardner (1913–2004), wrote the Christmas song "All I Want For Christmas Is My Two Front Teeth"
 Donald Stanley Gardner, American electrical engineer
 Don Gardner, American rhythm and blues singer, songwriter, and drummer
 Don Gardner (American football)